Queen of Kowloon is a 2000 Hong Kong film directed by Clarence Fok.

Tsang Tsou Choi, nicknamed the "King of Kowloon", made an appearance in the film.

Cast
 Suki Kwan
 Deanie Ip
 Wayne Lai
 Kwan Hoi-san
 Teresa Ha
 Lau Kong
 Helena Ma Hoi Lun
 Hui Fan
 Fung Wai Hang
 Debbie Tam Kit Man
 Tang Wing San

References

External links
 
 HKCinemagic entry
 HKMDB entry

2000 films
Hong Kong drama films